Elachista patersoniae is a moth of the family Elachistidae. It is found in south-eastern New South Wales, Australia.

The forewings are dark grey. The hindwings are dark brownish grey.

The larvae feed on Patersonia sericea and Patersonia longifolia. They mine the leaves of their host plant. The mine is white and has the form of a gradually widening gallery. It reaches a length of about 100 mm. The frass is deposited in a dense block in the upper part of the mine. Pupation takes place within the mine.

References

Moths described in 2011
patersoniae
Moths of Australia